was a futsal team representing Hello! Project. The team was founded on September 9, 2003 and was later disbanded on March 7, 2015.

History 
On April 23, 2007, nine new members from Mix Gatas were added to the team mainly from Berryz Kobo and Cute with one member from Hello! Project Eggs.

On June 18, 2007, Asami Konno joined select members of the team to create the group Ongaku Gatas while also continuing to play for the futsal team.

Team members

Supervisors and coaches

Players

Timeline 
 2003-11-16 - Hello! Project Sports Festival 2003 in Osaka
 2003-11-22 - Hello! Project Sports Festival 2003 in Tokyo
 2004-04-27 - Tokyo Women's League Futsal Competition
 2004-08-14 to 2004-08-15 - Odaiba Bouken O Cup (Cup Winner)
 2004-10-18 - Women Futsal in Aichi (Expo Cup) (Cup Winner)
 2004-11-14 - Hello! Project Sports Festival 2004 in Aichi (Epson Cup)
 2004-11-23 - Saitama Challenge-Match (Cup Winner)
 2004-12-05 - Hello! Project Sports Festival 2004 in Saitama (Epson Cup)
 2005-03-14 - Fuji TV 739 Cup
 2005-05-23 - Second Fuji TV 739 Cup (Cup Winner)
 2005-07-26 - Skylark Group Cup(Cup Winner) 
 2005-07-30 - Osaka King Festival
 2005-08-06 to 2005-08-30 - Skylark Group Odaiba Bouken League

Statistics

Assists

See also
Ongaku Gatas

References

External links 
 Official website

Hello! Project
Futsal clubs in Japan
Futsal clubs established in 2003
2003 establishments in Japan